The 1966 Prize of Moscow News was the first edition of an annual international figure skating competition organized in Moscow, Soviet Union. It was held December 15–18, 1966. Medals were awarded in the disciplines of men's singles, ladies' singles, pair skating and ice dancing. Czechoslovakia's Ondrej Nepela won the men's title ahead of East Germany's Günter Zöller and the Soviet Union's Vladimir Kurenbin. Martina Clausner of East Germany defeated Hungary's Zsuzsa Szentmiklossy for the ladies' title. Soviet skaters swept the pairs' podium, led by Tamara Moskvina / Alexei Mishin. The ice dancing title was won by Soviets Irina Grishkova / Viktor Ryzhkin.

Results

Men

Ladies

Pairs

Ice dancing

References

1966 in figure skating
Prize of Moscow News